Carluke Tigers are an amateur rugby league team. They play in the Scotland Division of the Rugby League Conference. The team is the only premier rugby league side in Lanarkshire. The club plays their home games at Hamilton Palace, Hamilton, while training takes place at The Moor Park in Carluke.

2009 season

League

2008 season

The 2008 season was the clubs first and they have managed to finish second in the Scottish Rugby League Conference, partly due to outstanding performances by Craig "Chubbs" Lewis, who holds the record number of tries in a rugby league season (17) due to his breathtaking sidestep and deceptive speed. Another player to mention is their Zimbabwean born prop Nico "The Pussycat" Nyemba, who along with Nick "Vinny" McAuley and player/coach Morgan Martin battered holes in every defence. This qualified them for the play-offs. However, they suffered defeats in both games which meant they would play in the Shield Final against Paisley Hurricanes.

League

Final League Table

RLC Playoffs

12 July 2008 - Edinburgh Eagles 42–18 Carluke Tigers

19 July 2008 - Carluke Tigers 20–28 Fife Lions

SRL Shield Final

2 August 2008 - Carluke Tigers 24–0 Paisley Hurricanes (Walkover)

Current squad

Club honours

 RLC Scottish Shield: 2008
 RLC Scottish Division: 2010

Possible Line-up

Replacements
14  Liam Bryson
15  Steven Paton
16  Fraser McKenzie
17  Jamie McAuley
18  Melvin Hart
19  William Stack
20  John Pringle
21  Ross Bryon
22  Lee McWhinnie
23  Andrew Robinson
24  Russell Johnston
25  Ralph McInally
26  Andy McLatchie

See also

Rugby league in Scotland
List of rugby league clubs in Britain

References

External links

Rugby League Conference teams
Sport in South Lanarkshire
Carluke
Rugby clubs established in 2008
2008 establishments in Scotland
Scottish rugby league teams